The 2016 season is Sukhothai first season in the Thai Premier League of Sukhothai Football Club.

Players

Current squad

Thai Premier League
Toyota Thai Premier League

Thai League Cup
Toyota League Cup

External links
 Official Website of Sukhothai FC
 Official Fanpage of Sukhothai FC
 Thaileague Official Website 

Sukhothai F.C. seasons
Thai football clubs 2016 season
Association football in Thailand lists